Carlos Humberto Escobar Ortiz (born 24 December 1989), known as Carlos Escobar, is a Chilean footballer that currently plays for Peruvian Primera División club Sport Huancayo as a striker.

Career

O'Higgins
Escobar in 2012 signed for O'Higgins from Coquimbo Unido. On 10 December 2013, he won the Apertura 2013–14 with O'Higgins. In the tournament, he played in 9 of 18 matches.

In 2014, he won the Supercopa de Chile against Deportes Iquique.

He participated with the club in the 2014 Copa Libertadores where they faced Deportivo Cali, Cerro Porteño and Lanús, being third and being eliminated in the group stage.

Sport Huancayo
He signed with Sport Huancayo for the 2023 season.

Personal life
He is the cousin of the brothers Luciano and Darwin Araya Escobar, both footballers from the Coquimbo Unido youth system.

Honours

Club
O'Higgins
Primera División de Chile (1): 2013 Apertura
Supercopa de Chile (1): 2014

Cobresal
Primera División de Chile (1): 2015 Clausura

Individual
O'Higgins
Medalla Santa Cruz de Triana: 2014

References

External links
 Carlos Escobar at Football-Lineups
 
 

1989 births
Living people
People from Coquimbo
Chilean footballers
Chilean expatriate footballers
Chilean Primera División players
Primera B de Chile players
Coquimbo Unido footballers
Deportes Temuco footballers
O'Higgins F.C. footballers
Cobresal footballers
San Luis de Quillota footballers
Universidad de Concepción footballers
Peruvian Primera División players
Sport Huancayo footballers
Chilean expatriate sportspeople in Peru
Expatriate footballers in Peru
Association football forwards